Noo or NOO may refer to:

Places
 Nõo, a small borough in Tartu County, Estonia
Nõo Parish

Fictional entities
 Noo, a fictional character from Creatures the World Forgot
 Noo-noo, a fictional character from Teletubbies

Other uses
 National Obesity Observatory, or NOO
 Noo Saro-Wiwa, British/Nigerian writer and journalist
 nine one one

See also
 New (disambiguation)
 No (disambiguation)
 Nu (disambiguation)